Lontzen is a municipality located in East Belgium. On January 1, 2018 Lontzen had a total population of 5,695. The total area is 28.73 km² which gives a population density of 198 inhabitants per km².

The municipality consists of the following sub-municipalities: Lontzen proper, Herbesthal, and Walhorn.

In the 19th century, a Low Franconian dialect was widely spoken in Lontzen.

See also
 List of protected heritage sites in Lontzen

References

External links
 
 Official web page